The Lousy Dance is an album by Simon Joyner, released in 1999.

Critical reception
Exclaim! called the album "a modern folk sound—campfire confessionals done up in a cosmopolitan context." CMJ New Music Report praised Joyner's "quiet intensity and folk-like musical rudiments."

Track listing

Personnel
Simon Joyner – Vocals, Guitar
Jessica Billey – Violin
Jeb Bishop – Trombone
Chris Deden – Percussion
Joe Ferguson – Engineering
Ryan Hembrey – Bass
Wil Hendricks – Piano, Accordion, Vibes
Charles Kim – Pedal Steel
Glenn Kotche – Drums, Percussion
Michael Krassner – Electric Guitar, Production, Engineering
Fred Lonberg-Holm – Cello, String and Horn Arrangements
Ernst Long – Flugelhorn, Trumpet
Ken Vandermark – Clarinet

References

External links
The Lousy Dance on Bandcamp
The Lousy Dance credits information at Discogs
Information on Black Dogs & Yellow Birds
Review by Tim McMahan

Simon Joyner albums
1999 albums